The Committee on the Scottish Government Handling of Harassment Complaints was a Committee of the Scottish Parliament which was set up to investigate the Alex Salmond scandal, in which the Scottish Government breached its own guidelines in its original investigation into claims of sexual harassment claims by former First Minister of Scotland Alex Salmond, leading to the loss of a judicial review into their actions. The Committee met from 2020 to 2021 and published its final report on 23 March 2021. Prior to publication, it leaked that the Committee concluded that First Minister Nicola Sturgeon misled them in her evidence.

Background

Alex Salmond was twice leader of the Scottish National Party (SNP; 1990-2000, 2004-2014) and the first First Minister of Scotland (2007-2014). His deputy and successor as First Minister and successor of his second period as leader of the SNP was Nicola Sturgeon.

In late 2017, the Scottish Government received complaints of sexual misconduct by former First Minister of Scotland Alex Salmond. The allegations were said to have occurred in 2013 while he was First Minister. In 2018, Salmond resigned from the Scottish National Party. He contested the allegations and said he intended to apply to rejoin the SNP once he had an opportunity to clear his name.

On 30 August 2018, he announced plans to seek a judicial review into the fairness of the process by which the Scottish Government handled the allegations. On 8 January 2019, Salmond won his case against the Scottish Government. The Scottish Parliament established the Committee to investigate the Scottish government’s handling of the affair.

On 24 January 2019, Police Scotland arrested Salmond, and he was charged with 14 offences, including two counts of attempted rape, nine of sexual assault, two of indecent assault, and one of breach of the peace. On 23 March 2020, Salmond was cleared of all charges. A jury found him not guilty of 12 charges, one charge was dropped by prosecutors earlier in the trial while one charge was found not proven.

Remit and phases
The Committee was set up with the remit:
To consider and report on the actions of the First Minister, Scottish Government officials and special advisers in dealing with complaints about Alex Salmond, former First Minister, considered under the Scottish Government’s “Handling of harassment complaints involving current or former ministers” procedure and actions in relation to the Scottish Ministerial Code.

The Committee has had four phases:
 "Development of the policy": how the Scottish Government developed, formulated and implemented its policy on the handling of harassment complaints involving current or former ministers.
 "Complaints handling": how were the complaints against Alex Salmond handled and were the steps in the published policy followed
 "Judicial review": on the conduct of the Scottish Government during the judicial review brought by Salmond
 "Scottish Ministerial Code": on Sturgeon's self-referral under the Code around a possible breach of that Code

Membership 
The Committee consists of 9 MSPs: 4 members of the SNP, which forms a minority government, and 5 members of other parties. The committee was chaired by Linda Fabiani (SNP), and co-chaired by Margaret Mitchell (Conservative Party). The other members are:

 Alasdair Allan (SNP)
 Jackie Baillie (Labour)
 Alex Cole-Hamilton (Liberal Democrats)
 Murdo Fraser (Conservative)
 Alison Johnstone (Green)
 Stuart McMillan (SNP)
 Maureen Watt (SNP)

Past members are Donald Cameron (Conservative) and Angela Constance (SNP). Andy Wightman replaced Alison Johnstone as a substitute member in December 2020.

Hearings
The Scottish Parliament set up the Committee on the Scottish Government Handling of Harassment Complaints to investigate how the Government breached its own guidelines in its original investigation into the harassment claims against Salmond, and then lost a judicial review into their actions and had to pay over £500,000 to Salmond for legal expenses.

Eligible evidence
A political row developed over what evidence to this committee Salmond could present. Giving evidence in person in February 2021, Salmond claimed that senior figures in the Scottish Government and the SNP plotted to remove him from public life and to send him to prison. Sturgeon disputed the allegations.

Differing claims over events
Sturgeon initially told parliament that she had first heard of the complaints against Salmond when he told her of them on 2 April 2018. However, 18 months later, she revised her account, saying she had forgotten about an earlier meeting, on 29 March 2018, in which Salmond's former chief of staff Geoff Aberdein told her about the complaints. Critics have described this as a possible breach of the ministerial code, which states that any minister who deliberately misleads parliament should resign. The 29 March meeting was not recorded: meetings on government business are meant to be recorded, but Sturgeon has said this is because it was an SNP meeting. In his evidence to the committee, Salmond said there was "no doubt" that Sturgeon had broken the ministerial code in not revealing the 29 March meeting sooner and in not recording what was really a meeting about government business. Sturgeon denies any wrongdoing.

Documents and emails published on 2 March 2021 showed that two people supported Salmond's assertion that the meeting was convened as a government, not party, matter. The publication also backed up Salmond's allegation that the identity of one of his accusers had been passed to his former chief of staff, contradicting Sturgeon's statement that "to the very best of my knowledge I do not think that happened". They also confirmed that the government had pursued the legal case against Salmond after being advised by lawyers that it was likely to fail.

Leaked findings
A few days before the Committee's report was due, it was leaked that the report will conclude that Sturgeon misled the Committee, a conclusion agreed by the 5 non-SNP MSPs against the 4 SNP MSPs. The Committee concluded it was "hard to believe" that Sturgeon did not know of concerns of inappropriate behaviour by Salmond before November 2017, the date when she says she was first alerted to any issues. They also concluded that Sturgeon gave an "inaccurate account" of the meeting with Salmond at her home on 2 April 2018.

The SNP expressed anger at the leaking of the report's findings and dismissed the findings as partisan. A spokesperson for Sturgeon claimed the committee were, 'smearing' her. James Hamilton's separate investigation into whether Sturgeon breached the ministerial code was released on 22 March 2021 and concluded that Sturgeon did not breach the code, although he caveated that: “It is for the Scottish parliament to decide whether they were in fact misled.”

Final conclusions and aftermath
The report from the committee was published on 23 March 2021 which concluded that there were both corporate and individual failings to blame. On the specific point on whether the committee (and thereby parliament) had been misled by Nicola Sturgeon the committee found a "fundamental contradiction" in her written evidence and concluded she had misled them, which was also a potential breach of the ministerial code. However, James Hamilton's independent report released the day before, had already cleared Nicola Sturgeon of breaching the ministerial code.  One individual failing was that of Permanent Secretary Leslie Evans who they stated was instrumental in the collapse of the defence to the judicial review action by Salmond.

They concluded that the major errors were a failure to identify crucial documents early and choosing an investigator who had previous contact with the women complainants. The report stated:

In April 2022 when discussing the Partygate scandal on Loose Women with Carol McGiffin, Nicola Sturgeon referred to the incident and stated an "independent inquiry found that I didn't mislead parliament", but had it found the opposite Ms Sturgeon stated that she would have resigned.

References

External links
 Committee website
 Committee Report

Scottish commissions and inquiries
2020 in British politics
2021 in British politics